The 1916 Notre Dame Fighting Irish football team represented the University of Notre Dame during the 1916 college football season, led by fourth-year head coach Jesse Harper. The Irish won all but one of their nine games, falling at  the season concluded on Thanksgiving with a  shutout at  George Gipp made a 62-yard field goal against Western Reserve.

Schedule

References

Notre Dame
Notre Dame Fighting Irish football seasons
Notre Dame Fighting Irish football